Chrysoglossa maxima is a moth of the family Notodontidae first described by Herbert Druce in 1897. It is found in Panama, Costa Rica and Guatemala.

Chrysoglossa mazxima is one of the largest species in the subfamily Dioptinae. The forewings of females are 26 mm long, with males being slightly shorter.

References

Moths described in 1897
Notodontidae